Pawtucket is a city in Providence County, Rhode Island, United States. The population was 75,604 at the 2020 census, making the city the fourth-largest in the state. Pawtucket borders Providence and East Providence to the south, Central Falls and Lincoln to the north, and North Providence to the west; to its east-northeast, the city borders the Massachusetts municipalities of Seekonk and Attleboro.

Pawtucket was an early and important center of textile manufacturing; the city is home to Slater Mill, a historic textile mill recognized for helping to found the Industrial Revolution in the United States.

History
The name "Pawtucket" comes from the Algonquian word for "river fall."

The Pawtucket region was said to have been one of the most populous places in New England prior to the arrival of European settlers. Native Americans would gather here to catch the salmon and smaller fish that gathered at the falls. The first European settler here was Joseph Jenks, who came to the region from Lynn, Massachusetts. He purchased about 60 acres near Pawtucket Falls in 1671, then established a sawmill and forge. These, along with the entire town, were later destroyed during King Philip's War.

Other settlers followed Jenks, and by 1775 the area was home to manufacturers of muskets, linseed oil, potash, and ships. Also around this time Oziel Wilkinson and his family set up an iron forge that made anchors, nails, screws, farm implements, and even cannons.

Pawtucket was an early and important center of cotton textiles during the American Industrial Revolution. Slater Mill, built in 1793 by Samuel Slater on the Blackstone River falls in downtown Pawtucket, was the first fully mechanized cotton-spinning mill in the United States. Slater Mill is known for developing a commercially successful production process not reliant on earlier horse-drawn processes developed in the United States. Slater constructed and operated machines for producing yarn. Other manufacturers continued, transforming Pawtucket into a center for textiles, iron working, and other products.

By the 1920s, Pawtucket was a prosperous mill town. The city had over a half-dozen movie theaters, two dozen hotels, and an impressive collection of fine commercial and residential architecture. Perhaps the most impressive public building in Pawtucket was the Leroy Theatre, an ornate movie palace that was called "Pawtucket's Million Dollar Theater". Many wealthy mill owners such as Darius Goff built their mansions in the area.

The textile business in New England declined during the Great Depression with many manufacturers closing or moving their facilities South where operations and labor were cheaper. Later in the 20th Century, Pawtucket began to lose some of its architectural heritage to the wrecking ball, including the Leroy Theatre.

Unlike numerous older mill towns in the region, Pawtucket retained much of its industrial base. Today, goods produced in the city include lace, non-woven and elastic woven materials, jewelry, silverware, metals, and textiles. Hasbro, one of the world's largest manufacturers of toys and games, is headquartered in Pawtucket.

Incorporation

Originally, the land west of the Blackstone River was part of nearby North Providence. East of the Blackstone River was originally settled as part of the Massachusetts town of Rehoboth. The first Pawtucket to be incorporated was in 1828 when Rehoboth gave up their land and Pawtucket became a new town in Massachusetts. In 1862 the eastern portion was absorbed into Providence County, Rhode Island. On March 1, 1862, after a nearly 225-year border dispute between Rhode Island and Plymouth/Massachusetts, the area of Pawtucket and East Providence was shifted into Rhode Island, and the new border remains to this day. In 1874, the land west of the river was taken from North Providence and added to the town of Pawtucket, but acted as two different towns. Finally in 1886, West and East Pawtucket were merged and the city was incorporated.

Geography
Pawtucket lies within three drainage basins. These include the Blackstone River (including the Seekonk River), the Moshassuck River and the Ten Mile River.

Demographics

As of the census of 2010, there were 71,141 people, 32,055 households, and 18,508 families residing in the city. Pawtucket was the fourth most populous of Rhode Island's 39 cities and towns. The racial makeup of the city was 50.4% Non-Hispanic white, 18.9% Non-Hispanic African American, 0.60% Native American, 1.6% Non-Hispanic Asian, 0.10% Pacific Islander, mixed race 3.9%, 4.7% other. About 25% of residents are Latino.

There were 32,055 households, out of which 30.5% had children under the age of 18 living with them, 39.7% were married couples living together, 16.8% had a female householder with no husband present, and 38.4% were non-families. 32.3% of all households were made up of individuals, and 12.5% had someone living alone who was 65 years of age or older. The average household size was 2.41 and the average family size was 3.07.

In the city, the population was spread out, with 24.9% under the age of 18, 9.1% from 18 to 24, 31.3% from 25 to 44, 19.9% from 45 to 64, and 14.8% who were 65 years of age or older. The median age was 35 years. For every 100 females, there were 90.2 males. For every 100 females age 18 and over, there were 85.9 males.

The median income for a household in the city was $28,124, and the median income for a family was $40,578. Males had a median income of $31,129 versus $23,391 for females. The per capita income for the city was $17,008. About 14.9% of families and 16.8% of the population were below the poverty line, including 24.5% of those under age 18 and 15.2% of those age 65 or over.

According to the 2000 census, 20.6% of Pawtucket residents are French or French-Canadian. Like nearby cities Providence, Fall River, and New Bedford., Pawtucket hosts a significant population from across the former Portuguese Empire (11.6%), including a significant Cape Verdean population.

Pawtucket is also one of the few areas of the United States with a significant Liberian population, mostly refugees from Charles Taylor's regime; Rhode Island has the highest per capita Liberian population in the country. Pawtucket has a high concentration of West Africans.

Economy
Hasbro, a Fortune 1000 toy and game making company, is headquartered in Pawtucket.

Many healthcare, retail and insurance companies are headquartered in Pawtucket.

Fox Point Pickles, a pickling company, is headquartered in Pawtucket.

Arts and culture

The City of Pawtucket has been supportive of the arts community since 1975. On September 2, 1977, The Beach Boys performed a concert at Narragansett Park attended by 40,000 people, the largest concert audience in Rhode Island history. In 2017, music historians Al Gomes and Connie Watrous of Big Noise were successful in getting the street where the concert stage stood (the corner of 455 Narragansett Park Drive) officially renamed as "Beach Boys Way".

In January, 1999, Herb Weiss, of the Planning Department, was hired to oversee the City's newly created Arts District. Through the support of then Mayor James E. Doyle and Planning Department Michael Cassidy, Weiss brought significant recognition for Pawtucket-Arts oriented development strategy. Mayor Doyle and Weiss hired researcher Ann Galligan, of Northeastern University, to create an arts and cultural plan. Over the years Pawtucket has become known as a center for arts and culture.

Several experimental/indie rock bands have recorded albums at Machines with Magnets, a recording studio and art gallery in Downtown Pawtucket. Bands that have performed or recorded here include Battles, Lightning Bolt, Brown Bird, and Fang Island.

One hub for arts and culture in the city is Lorraine Mills, a repurposed mill building on the eastern side of the city, which houses institutions including Mixed Magic Theatre, Wage House (comedy club), Pawtucket Arts Collaborative, and Crooked Current Brewery.

Each September, the city, in conjunction with the Pawtucket Arts Festival Board of Directors, members chosen from the community, produce an annual citywide Arts Festival.

Pawtucket is home to McCoy Stadium, where the Pawtucket Red Sox, the Triple-A Minor League Baseball affiliate of the Boston Red Sox, played from 1970 to 2020. The team was owned by Ben Mondor until his death and was sold by his estate. The longest professional baseball game in history, 33 innings, was played at McCoy Stadium in 1981. Pawtucket has a history of professional baseball dating back to 1892, including the Pawtucket Indians. The PawSox franchise was relocated to Worcester, Massachusetts, to become the Worcester Red Sox beginning with the 2021 season.

In 1934, the Narragansett Park opened for Thoroughbred horse racing. Until its closure in 1978, the track hosted several important races that drew some of the top horses from around the United States including Hall of Fame members; Seabiscuit, War Admiral and Gun Bow.

Parks and recreation
 Slater Memorial Park has full recreational facilities including tennis courts and picnic areas.
 Daggett Farm
 Water Color Gallery open to the public for viewing
 Daggett House
 Marconi Garden

Education

Public schools
Public education in Pawtucket is directed by the Pawtucket School Department and contains these schools:

Senior high schools
 Charles E. Shea
 William E. Tolman
 Blackstone Academy Charter School
 Jacqueline M Walsh School for the Arts

Middle schools
 Joseph Jenks
 Samuel Slater
 Lyman B. Goff

Elementary schools
 Elizabeth Baldwin
 M. Virginia Cunningham
 Flora S. Curtis
 Curvin McCabe
 Fallon Memorial
 Nathanael Greene
 Agnes E. Little
 Potter Burns
 Francis J. Varieur
 Henry J. Winters

Catholic schools
The Quality Hill section of Pawtucket is home to St. Raphael Academy. It is a private college preparatory school founded on the basis of St. John the Baptist de la Salle. "Saints" is a small school consisting of roughly 500 students with a student to teacher ratio of about 15:2. The "Saints and Lady Saints" are very successful in sports including baseball, football, basketball, and softball. St. Raphael Academy is a rival of William E. Tolman. The two schools took part in a Thanksgiving Day football game that was played in McCoy Stadium for over 70 years, though game is no longer played. William E. Tolman now competes annually against its fellow Pawtucket public high school Charles E. Shea, rather than against St. Raphael Academy, a private Catholic high school.

Pawtucket was home to Bishop Keough High School, a small all-girls catholic high school in the Fairlawn neighborhood.

The city also has three Catholic elementary schools: St. Cecilia School, St. Teresa School and Woodlawn Catholic Regional School.

Infrastructure

Transportation
Pawtucket is served by several RIPTA local bus routes plus the R-Line. Pawtucket/Central Falls station on the MBTA Commuter Rail Providence/Stoughton Line is planned to open on January 23, 2023, replacing the former station that closed in 1981.

Highways and roads
Interstate 95 and U.S. 1 also traverse the western part of Pawtucket. Some of the slowest posted speeds on I-95 are in the city due to the "S-curves" near downtown. To preserve certain buildings in the city, planners snaked I-95, creating sharp bends in the highway.

Downtown Circulator

Pawtucket's Downtown Circulator was a one-way loop through downtown; it is similar to British concepts of ring roads. A similar concept was also tried in Providence.

The circulator used East Avenue, High Street, Summer Street, Goff Avenue, Dexter Street and Park Place West. Each half of the Circulator carried one direction of U.S. 1; sections also carried westbound RI 15 and northbound RI 114. It was signed with a big "C" on overhead signs.

There are no longer signs for the circulator, though the road configuration remains. Providence's Downtown Ring Roads have suffered a similar fate.

Notable people

Sister town
  Belper, Derbyshire, England, United Kingdom
Belper was where Samuel Slater had been apprenticed to Jedediah Strutt, learning the secrets of Richard Arkwright's Water Frame. He is sometimes known in that area as "Slater the traitor". Belper holds an annual town festival in honor of Pawtucket and Belper being sister towns.

See also

References

External links

 
 
 

 
Cape Verdean American history
Cities in Providence County, Rhode Island
Cities in Rhode Island
History of the textile industry
Providence metropolitan area